The R246 road is a regional road in Ireland. It is a road mostly on the Fanad peninsula in County Donegal. The northernmost section of the road at Portsalon forms part of the Wild Atlantic Way.

The R246 branches north from the R249, then passing Lough Fern on the way to Milford. From Milford the road travels along the east shore of Mulroy Bay before turning east to Lough Swilly at Portsalon. Just off the road, the beach at Ballymastocker Bay (Portsalon) has been considered one of the world's finest.

References

Regional roads in the Republic of Ireland
Roads in County Donegal